The NAACP Image Awards is an annual awards ceremony presented by the U.S.-based National Association for the Advancement of Colored People (NAACP) to honor outstanding performances in film, television, theatre, music, and literature. Similar to other awards, like the Oscars and the Grammys, the over 40 categories of the Image Awards are voted on by the award organization's members (in this case, NAACP members). Honorary awards (similar to the Academy Honorary Award) have also been included, such as the President's Award, the Chairman's Award, the Entertainer of the Year, and the Hall of Fame Award. Beyoncé is the All-Time leading winner with 25 wins as a solo artist.

History
The award ceremony was first organized and presented on August 13, 1967, by activists Maggie Hathaway, Sammy Davis Jr. and Willis Edwards, all three of whom were leaders of the Beverly Hills-Hollywood NAACP branch. While  it was first taped for television by NBC (which broadcast the awards from 1987 to 1994 in January, on weeks when Saturday Night Live wasn't airing a new episode), it would only be broadcast in primetime beginning in 1996. Due to changes in timing of the awards, there was no awards ceremony held the following years: 1973, as the timing was changed to honor a full calendar year early in the following year (reverted to a "late-in-year" ceremony for 1981–1990); 1991, as the timing returned to late in a calendar year to honor that same year; 1995, 

The first live broadcast of the awards, also on the Fox Network, occurred in 2007 for its 38th edition (up until 2007, the ceremony had been broadcast with tape delay) and the annual ceremonies usually take place in or around the Los Angeles area, in February or early March. The 44th edition aired on NBC. Sources have had trouble verifying the winners in the top categories from 1983 to 1995.

The New York firm Society Awards manufactures the trophy since its redesign in 2008.

Event dates and locations

Controversies
In 1987, the NAACP came under fire for dropping their Best Actress award for that year. They defended this position, citing a lack of meaningful roles for black women. In 1990, they were criticized once again for not awarding Best Actress. This was the fourth time it could not find enough nominees for Best Actress. Sandra Evers-Manly, president of the organization's Beverly Hills/Hollywood branch, said, "The [film] industry has yet to show diversity or present realistic leading roles for African-American women."

In other years, some nominees have been called undeserving of NAACP attention. In response, some NAACP representatives have argued that the quality of an artist's work is the salient issue, with factors such as criminal charges inconsequential in this regard. For example, in 1994, Tupac Shakur was a nominee for Outstanding Actor in a Motion Picture for the film Poetic Justice despite the filing of sexual assault charges against him in December 1993. More specifically, Shakur had been accused of felony counts of forcible sodomy and unlawful detainment in New York City, when a woman alleged that he and two other men held her down in a hotel room while a fourth man sodomized her. Shakur was also indicted for two counts of aggravated assault in an unrelated incident in which he supposedly shot and wounded two off-duty police officers. In the same year, Martin Lawrence was criticized for winning Outstanding Actor in a Comedy Series and Outstanding Comedy Series and the show was criticized for its sexual controversy. In 2004, R. Kelly's Chocolate Factory was nominated for Outstanding Album while he was under indictment for charges related to child pornography.

Other nominees have faced controversy due to their portrayals of major civil rights figures. In 2003, the movie Barbershop received five nominations, including Outstanding Motion Picture and Outstanding Supporting Actor (for Cedric the Entertainer's performance). In the film, Cedric's character makes pejorative remarks about Rosa Parks, Martin Luther King Jr., Michael Jackson, and Jesse Jackson, content that elicited criticism, including Rosa Parks's refusal to attend the awards event. The rap group OutKast received six nominations in 2004 but faced criticism because they had previously recorded the song "Rosa Parks", which had resulted in Parks suing them over the use of her name.

Award categories
These are the major categories:

Motion picture
 
 Outstanding Motion Picture
 Outstanding Documentary
 Outstanding Actress in a Motion Picture
 Outstanding Actor in a Motion Picture
 Outstanding Supporting Actress in a Motion Picture
 Outstanding Supporting Actor in a Motion Picture
 Outstanding International Motion Picture
 Outstanding Independent Motion Picture
 Outstanding Directing in a Motion Picture
 Outstanding Writing in a Motion Picture
 Outstanding Character Voice Performance – Motion Picture
 Outstanding Short-Form (animated)

Music
 
 Outstanding New Artist
 Outstanding Female Artist
 Outstanding Male Artist
 Outstanding Duo or Group
 Outstanding Jazz Artist
 Outstanding Jazz Album
 Outstanding Gospel Artist
 Outstanding Gospel Album (Traditional or Contemporary)
 Outstanding Music Video
 Outstanding Song (Traditional and Contemporary)
 Outstanding Album

Literature
 
 Outstanding Literary Work – Fiction
 Outstanding Literary Work – Nonfiction
 Outstanding Literary Work – Biography/Autobiography
 Outstanding Literary Work – Debut Author
 Outstanding Literary Work – Poetry
 Outstanding Literary Work – Instructional
 Outstanding Literary Work – Children
 Outstanding Literary Work – Youth/Teens

Podcast
 
 Outstanding News and Information Podcast
 Outstanding Lifestyle/Self-Help Podcast
 Outstanding Society and Culture Podcast
 Outstanding Literary Work – Debut Author
 Outstanding Arts and Entertainment Podcast

Television
 
 Outstanding Drama Series
 Outstanding Actress in a Drama Series
 Outstanding Actor in a Drama Series
 Outstanding Supporting Actress in a Drama Series
 Outstanding Supporting Actor in a Drama Series
 Outstanding Directing in a Drama Series
 Outstanding Writing in a Drama Series
 Outstanding Children's Program
 Outstanding Comedy Series
 Outstanding Actress in a Comedy Series
 Outstanding Actor in a Comedy Series
 Outstanding Supporting Actress in a Comedy Series
 Outstanding Supporting Actor in a Comedy Series
 Outstanding Actress in a Daytime Drama Series
 Outstanding Actor in a Daytime Drama Series
 Outstanding Television Movie, Mini-Series or Dramatic Special
 Outstanding Actress in a Television Movie, Mini-Series or Dramatic Special
 Outstanding Actor in a Television Movie, Mini-Series or Dramatic Special
 Outstanding Performance by a Youth (Series, Special, Television Movie or Limited-series)
 Outstanding News/Information – Series or Special
 Outstanding Talk Series
 Outstanding Variety – Series or Special
 Outstanding Character Voice-Over Performance (Television)

Special awards
 
 Vanguard Award 
 Chairman's Award
 President's Award
 Hall of Fame Award
 Entertainer of the Year
 Activist of the Year
 Social Media Personality of the Year

References

External links
 

 
Awards established in 1967
Awards honoring African Americans
1969 establishments in the United States